Whitewater is a census-designated place and unincorporated community in Phillips County, Montana, United States. Its population was 64 as of the 2010 census. Whitewater has a post office with ZIP code 59544.

In 1927, the town moved about 7 miles west to be on the new Great Northern Railway branch line.

Demographics

Climate
According to the Köppen Climate Classification system, Whitewater has a semi-arid climate, abbreviated "BSk" on climate maps.

Education
Whitewater School District educates students from kindergarten through 12th grade. Whitewater High School's team name is the Penguins.

References

Census-designated places in Phillips County, Montana
Census-designated places in Montana